Vicente Pascual Collado (born 31 August 1986 in Argente, Aragon) is a Spanish footballer who plays as a midfielder.

External links
 
 Futbolme profile 

1986 births
Living people
People from Teruel Community
Sportspeople from the Province of Teruel
Spanish footballers
Footballers from Aragon
Association football midfielders
La Liga players
Segunda División players
Segunda División B players
Real Zaragoza B players
Real Zaragoza players
SD Huesca footballers
CD Castellón footballers